"You Still Move Me" is a song written and recorded by American country music artist Dan Seals.  It was released in September 1986 as the lead-off single from the album On the Front Line.  The song went to number one on the Billboard country charts in 1987.

Charts

Weekly charts

Year-end charts

References

1986 singles
Dan Seals songs
Songs written by Dan Seals
Song recordings produced by Kyle Lehning
EMI Records singles
1986 songs